The 2016 American Athletic Conference men's soccer tournament is the 4th edition of the American Athletic Conference Men's Soccer Tournament. The tournament decides the American Athletic Conference champion and guaranteed representative into the 2016 NCAA Division I Men's Soccer Championship.  The semifinals and finals were played at Corbett Soccer Stadium on the campus of South Florida in Tampa, FL on November 11 & 13.

Seeding and format
The teams are seeded based on their performance in the conference's round-robin regular season.  The top four teams qualify for the event.

Bracket

Note: * denotes overtime period(s).

Results

Semifinals

Final

All-Tournament team
Jesus Colombo, UCF
Abdou Mbacke Thiam, Connecticut
Prosper Figbe, South Florida
Marcus Epps, South Florida
Nazeem Bartman, South Florida
Spasoje Stefanovic, South Florida
Quinton Duncan, Tulsa
Juan Sánchez, Tulsa (most outstanding offensive player)
Ray Saari, Tulsa
Rollie Rocha, Tulsa
Jake McGuire, Tulsa (most outstanding defensive player)

Television/internet coverage
The semifinals were streamed live on the American Digital Network. The final was carried live on ESPN2 and 4 hours later on ESPNU.

References

2016 American Athletic Conference men's soccer season
American Athletic Conference Men's Soccer Tournament
American soccer tournament